The people listed below were all born in, residents of, or otherwise closely associated with the city of Northampton, Massachusetts.

Notable people

Artists

 Leonard Baskin, sculptor, illustrator, print-maker, writer, and teacher at local colleges

Economists

 Herbert Gintis, economist 
 Andrew Zimbalist, prominent sports economist and father of Jeff and Michael Zimbalist

Educators

 Carol T. Christ, former president of Smith College and Victorian Literature Scholar
 Anna Cheney Edwards, 19th-century professor at Mount Holyoke College
 Hannah Lyman (1816–1871), first lady principal of Vassar College

Film and television

 Mary-Ellis Bunim, television producer and co-creator of MTV's The Real World and Road Rules
 Michael Brooks, political commentator, author.
 John Carpenter, first top-prize winner on Who Wants to Be a Millionaire?
 Paul Johnson Calderon, socialite, heir, and television personality best known for co-starring on The CW's High Society
 Galaxy Craze, actress and author known for bestselling novel By the Shore
 Rachel Maddow, radio personality, MSNBC television host, and liberal political commentator 
David Pakman, television and radio personality, nationally syndicated progressive talk show host, liberal political commentator
William Powell, actor
 Liza Snyder, actress (Yes, Dear; Pay It Forward)
 Talisa Soto, actress   
 Jeff Zimbalist, documentary filmmaker and Tribeca Film Festival award winner

Government and law

 Ebenezer Allen, American soldier, pioneer, and member of the Vermont General Assembly; born in Northampton
Christine Chandler, attorney and member of the New Mexico House of Representatives
 Calvin Coolidge, served as mayor of Northampton before becoming the 48th governor of Massachusetts and the 30th president of the United States 
 Jonathan Hunt (1738–1808), early Vermont pioneer, landowner, officeholder, born Northampton
 Bernie Juskiewicz, Businessman and Vermont state representative
 Henry W. Lord, U.S. Congressman
 Britt K. Slabinski, served as a SEAL with the United States Navy

Music industry

 Chris Collingwood, lead singer of the band Fountains of Wayne
 Kim Gordon, of the band Sonic Youth 
 Jason Loewenstein, singer and songwriter
 Thurston Moore, of the band Sonic Youth 
 Nerissa Nields, folk musician, author, and member of the band The Nields
Kim Rosen, Grammy nominated audio mastering engineer

Reformers

 Sylvester Graham, advocate of vegetarianism and namesake of the graham cracker
 Sojourner Truth, African American abolitionist and orator

Religion

 Jonathan Edwards, 18th-century Congregational theologian, philosopher, leader of First Great Awakening and local pastor
 Elder John Strong, 17th-century English-born New England colonist, politician, Puritan church leader; one of the founders of Windsor, Connecticut and Northampton, Massachusetts

Sports

 Stu Miller, Major League Baseball pitcher
 Tim Petrovic, professional golfer
 Willy Workman (born 1990), American-Israeli basketball player for Hapoel Jerusalem in the Israeli Basketball Premier League
William Yorzyk, gold medal winning U.S. Olympic swimmer

Writers

 Jeanne Birdsall, children's author, best known for her debut novel, The Penderwicks: A Summer Tale of Four Sisters, Two Rabbits, and a Very Interesting Boy 
 William Cullen Bryant, 19th-century author and newspaper editor
 Augusten Burroughs, author; his bestseller Running with Scissors describes his strange childhood in Northampton
 George Washington Cable, author and reformer; lived in Northampton 1885–1915 
 Paul Johnson Calderon, journalist, best known for his work with Deuxmoi.com, The Pro 411 
 Eric Carle, children's book author and illustrator 
 Lydia Maria Child, author of the Thanksgiving poem "Over the River and through the Woods" 
 Kevin Eastman, comic book artist and writer, co-published Teenage Mutant Ninja Turtles comics with Peter Laird in their Northampton studio
 Jonathan Harr, author of A Civil Action
 Jeph Jacques, creator of the webcomic Questionable Content
 Tracy Kidder, author (while he was not born in Northampton, his 1999 book "Home Town" is a profile of the city, and his 1993 "Old Friends" takes place at Linda Manor in Northampton)
 Michael Klare, author, professor and defense correspondent for The Nation
 Peter Laird, comic book artist and writer, co-published Teenage Mutant Ninja Turtles comics with Kevin Eastman in their Northampton studio
 Elinor Lipman, author
 Lesléa Newman, author of Heather Has Two Mommies
 Cynthia Propper Seton, novelist
 Kurt Vonnegut, satirist, novelist, known for works like Slaughter-House Five and Cat's Cradle
 Ocean Vuong, poet, essayist, and author of On Earth We're Briefly Gorgeous
 Peter Wild, poet, author, and Professor of English at the University of Arizona 
 Mo Willems, popular children's book author

Others

Albert Francis Blakeslee (1874–1954), botanist, died in Northampton
Tom Friedman, conceptual sculptor
 John Stoddard, president of the Georgia Historical Society
 William Dwight Whitney, linguist

References

Northampton, Massachusetts

Northampton, Massachusetts